Canuto "Jojo" M. Lapus (April 12, 1943 – September 20, 2006), was a Filipino showbiz columnist and screenwriter. He was known for directing Pepeng Shotgun (1981), Kahit Buhay Ko... (1992), and Leonardo Delos Reyes: Alyas Waway. He was the father of John Lapus.

References

External links
 

1943 births
2006 deaths
20th-century screenwriters
Filipino screenwriters
Filipino LGBT writers
20th-century LGBT people